The men's 10,000 metres in speed skating at the 1964 Winter Olympics took place on 7 February, at the Eisschnellaufbahn.

Records
Prior to this competition, the existing world and Olympic records were as follows:

Results

References

Men's speed skating at the 1964 Winter Olympics